Estadio Las Flores is a football stadium located in Jalapa, Guatemala. It is home to first division club Deportivo Jalapa (Los Tigres); its capacity is 15,000.

Las Flores